Gennaro Gallo (born 8 January 1984) is an Italian lightweight rower. He won a gold medal at the 2009 World Rowing Championships in Poznań with the lightweight men's eight.

References

1984 births
Living people
Italian male rowers
World Rowing Championships medalists for Italy